Adam Shortt  (1859–1931) was an economic historian in Ontario. He was the first full-time employed academic in the field at a Canadian university (Queen's University).

Biography
Shortt was born in Kilworth, Ontario, on 24 November 1859 to George Shortt and Mary Shields. At the age of twenty he attended Queen's University with the intention of becoming a Presbyterian minister. When he graduated in 1883 however, he pursued graduate studies in philosophy, chemistry and botany.

In 1886 Shortt married Elizabeth Smith, one of the first women to receive a medical degree in Canada; they had two daughters and a son together. The same year he began working as a tutor for John Watson, and in 1887 was appointed a lecturer in the field of political economy at Queen's. In 1891 he was the first to be appointed the John A. Macdonald Professor of Political Science. While a lecturer at Queen's, he was appointed as the editor of The Queen's Journal and is largely credited with moving the paper from a strict focus on campus matters to a more mixed discussion on all university interests, particularly to broaden the readership amongst alumni. He is credited with establishing the first card catalogue at the Queen's Library.

Regarded as the father of professional economics in Canada, Shortt took a historical approach as differentiated from economic theory, as he believed that the economics of nations depend on natural resources, geographic location, and specific economic attributes. Shortt went on to Glasgow University for his master's degree in political economy. He is most well known for his research into the history of Canadian banking and for his association with the National Archives of Canada.

In 1906 he was elected a fellow of the Royal Society of Canada and a commander of the Order of St Michael and St George in 1911. At the time of his death on 14 January 1931, he was a chairman of the Board of Historical Publications at the National Archives, a position he had held since 1918.

Select publications
 1898: The Early History of Canadian Banking: Canadian Currency and Exchange Under French Rule, Journal of the Canadian Bankers' Association via Internet Archive
 1904: 
 1907: 
 1909:

References

Footnotes

Bibliography

Further reading

External links
 
 
 

1859 births
1931 deaths
19th-century Canadian historians
Canadian male non-fiction writers
Canadian Companions of the Order of St Michael and St George
Fellows of the Royal Society of Canada
Persons of National Historic Significance (Canada)
Academic staff of the Queen's University at Kingston
20th-century Canadian historians
Presidents of the Canadian Political Science Association